This is a list of the equipment used by the Armed Forces of Belarus. The military forces of Belarus are almost exclusively armed with Soviet-era equipment inherited from the Soviet Union. Although large in numbers, some Western experts consider some of it outdated.

Infantry weapons

Small arms

Vehicles

References 

Belarus
Military equipment of Belarus